Razorworks was a video game developer based in Kidlington, United Kingdom. Razorworks was founded in August 1996 and was owned by the video game publisher Empire Interactive. The Razorworks studio was closed in July 2008 due to Empire Interactive's poor financial situation (Empire Interactive subsequently went into administration in May 2009).

During its 12-year lifetime the team grew from 4 to 34 people and produced a total of 14 titles for PC and games consoles.

Razorworks initially developed the Enemy Engaged series of combat flight simulators which were nominated for several Simulation Game of the Year awards. Razorworks subsequently developed a number of titles for Empire Interactive's Ford Racing series, including Ford Racing Full Blown, a coin-op video game developed for Sega Amusements of Europe. Razorworks also developed arcade machine emulation technology used to produce the Taito Legends titles and Double Dragon for Xbox Live Arcade. Razorworks' final project was a remake of Empire Interactive's classic puzzle game Pipe Mania.

Razorworks developed games for PC, PlayStation 2, PlayStation Portable, Xbox, Xbox 360, Nintendo DS, Wii and Sega arcade cabinets.

Games 
Enemy Engaged: Apache vs Havoc (1998)
Enemy Engaged: RAH-66 Comanche vs. KA-52 Hokum (2000)
Total Immersion Racing (2002)
Ford Racing 2 (2003)
Ford Racing 3 (2004)
Taito Legends (2005)
Ford Racing Full Blown (2006)
Taito Legends 2 (2006)
Ford Street Racing (2006)
Double Dragon (2007)
Speedball 2: Brutal Deluxe (2007)
Ford Racing Off Road (2008)
Pipe Mania (2008)

References

External links 
 (archived)

Companies based in Oxfordshire
Defunct companies of England
Defunct video game companies of the United Kingdom
Kidlington
Video game companies established in 1996
Video game companies disestablished in 2008
Video game development companies